Constable Bay is a bay in the Wandel Sea, Northern Greenland. Administratively Constable Bay and its surroundings belong to the Northeast Greenland National Park.

Constable Bay is the northernmost bay in the world. The area of the bay is uninhabited.

History
The bay was named in 1900 by Robert Peary after James M. Constable, a prominent member of the Peary Arctic Club in New York.

Geography
It is a fairly large indentation, with Cape James Hill rising at its eastern end. The bay is clogged by fast ice the year round.

The northern arm of the Sif Glacier, discharging from the Roosevelt Range to the south, ends in a valley with its mouth in Constable Bay, having formed prominent terminal moraines.

See also
List of northernmost items

References

External links
The terminal moraine in Constable Bugt
Greenland North Coast - Jeff Shea
Geese, seabirds and mammals in North and Northeast Greenland

Bays of Greenland
Peary Land